All 39 snake taxa that are known to naturally occur in Indiana are tabulated below, along with their population ranges in the state, conservation status, and level of danger they pose to humans (upon biting them).

References

Indiana
Snakes